The Shipbuilder and his Wife is a 1633 painting by Rembrandt.  The sitters were identified in 1970 as Jan Rijcksen (1560/2–1637) and his wife Griet Jans Rijcksen.  Rijcksen was a shareholder in the Dutch East India Company, and became its master shipbuilder in 1620.  The painting has been in the Royal Collection since 1811.

At this relatively early date, Rembrandt was accomplished at depicting the natural surfaces of wood, leather, skin, and hair, and he had become a fashionable portrait painter.  Rather than making the usual pair of separate husband-and-wife paintings, like his more typical Portrait of a Man Rising from His Chair and Portrait of a Young Woman with a Fan, Rembrandt combined them into a single double portrait, with the two sitters interacting.  Rijcksen is shown seated as a desk, where he has been making drawings of ship designs, holding a pair of compasses; his wife has just entered the room to hand her husband a written note.  The letter shown in the painting is addressed to "Jan ryensz" [sic]  The drawing of a ship shown in the painting bears the signature and date: "Rembrandt. f: / 1633"

This portrait is among the best documented of Rembrandt's works. It was recorded in the estate of the sitters' son Cornelis Jansz. It was imported to England and sold at Christie's in London in 1811 to the Prince Regent (later King George IV)  and remains in the Royal Collection.

The oil on canvas painting measures  but it may have been cut down from a larger work: an early etching dated 1800 shows more space above the sitters' heads.

References

 The Shipbuilder and his Wife, Royal Collection
 A Corpus of Rembrandt Paintings: Volume II: 1631–1634, J. Bruyn, B. Haak, S. H. Levie, P. J. J. van Thiel, pp. 367–377
 Portrait of the shipbuilder Jan Rijcksen and his wife Griet Jans, 1633 in the RKD
 933. The Shipbuilder and his Wife in Hofstede de Groot, 1914 

Shipbuilder
1633 paintings
17th-century portraits
Shipbuilder